The Luck of Barry Lyndon is a picaresque novel by William Makepeace Thackeray, first published as a serial in Fraser's Magazine in 1844, about a member of the Irish gentry trying to become a member of the English aristocracy. Thackeray, who based the novel on the life and exploits of the Anglo-Irish rake and fortune-hunter Andrew Robinson Stoney, later reissued it under the title The Memoirs of Barry Lyndon, Esq. The novel is narrated by Lyndon himself, who functions as a quintessentially unreliable narrator.

The novel was adapted by Stanley Kubrick into his 1975 film Barry Lyndon.

Plot summary
Redmond Barry of Ballybarry, born to a genteel but ruined Irish family, fancies himself a gentleman. At the prompting of his mother, he learns what he can of courtly manners and swordplay, but fails at more scholarly subjects like Latin. He is a hot-tempered, passionate lad, and falls madly in love with his cousin, Nora. As she is a spinster a few years older than Redmond, she is seeking a prospect with more ready cash to pay family debts.

The lad tries to engage in a duel with Nora's suitor, an English officer named John Quin. He is made to think that he has killed the man, though his pistol was actually loaded with tow, a dummy load of heavy, knotted fibres. Quin, struck with the harmless load, faints in fright.

Redmond flees to Dublin, where he quickly falls in with bad company in the way of con artists, and soon loses all his money. Pursued by creditors, he enlists as a common private in a British Army infantry regiment headed for service in Germany during the Seven Years' War.

Once in Germany, despite a promotion to corporal, he hates the army and seeks to desert. When his lieutenant is wounded, Redmond helps take him to a German village for treatment. The Irishman pretends to suffer from insanity, and after several days absconds with the lieutenant's uniform, papers, and money. As part of his ruse, he convinces the locals that he is the real Lieutenant Fakenham, and the wounded man is the mad Corporal Barry. Redmond Barry rides off toward a neutral German territory, hoping for better fortune.

His bad luck continues, however, as he is joined on the road by a Prussian officer. The German soon realises that Redmond is a deserter, but rather than turn him over to the British to be hanged, impresses him into the Prussian army (for a bounty). Redmond hates Prussian service as much or more than he hated British service, but the men are carefully watched to prevent desertion. Redmond marches with Frederick's army into the Battle of Kunersdorf, barely surviving the disastrous cavalry charge that devastates the Prussian army. He becomes the servant of Captain Potzdorff, and is involved in the intrigues of that gentleman.

After several months have passed, a stranger travelling under Austrian protection arrives in Berlin. Redmond is asked to spy on the stranger, an older man called Chevalier de Balibari (sc. Ballybarry). He immediately realises that this is his uncle, the adventurer who disappeared many years ago. The uncle arranges to smuggle his nephew out of Prussia, and this is soon done. The two Irishmen and an accomplice wander around Europe, gambling and spending as they go.

Eventually, the Barrys end up in a Rhineland Duchy, where they win considerable sums of money, and Redmond cleverly sets up a plan to marry a young countess of some means. Again, fortune turns against him, and a series of circumstances undermines his complex plan. (The story of the unhappy Princess Olivia was based on a scandalous account of Duchess Augusta of Brunswick-Wolfenbüttel by Étienne-Léon de Lamothe-Langon.) Uncle and nephew are forced to leave Germany—both unmarried.

While staying in France, Redmond comes into the acquaintance of the Countess of Lyndon, an extraordinarily wealthy noblewoman married to a much older man in poor health. He has some success in seducing the lady, but her husband clings to life. Eventually, she goes back to England. Redmond is upset, but bides his time; upon hearing that the husband has died the following year, he moves.

Through a series of adventures, Redmond eventually bullies and seduces the Countess of Lyndon, who marries him under duress. After the wedding, he moves into Hackton Castle, which he has completely remodelled at great expense. Redmond admits several times in the course of his narrative that he has no control over a budget, and spends his new bride's birthright money freely. He looks after a few childhood benefactors in Ireland, his cousin Ulick (who had often stood up for him as a boy), and makes himself over into the most fashionable man in the district.

As the American War of Independence breaks out, Barry Lyndon (as he now calls himself) raises a company of soldiers to be sent to America. He also defeats his wife's cousins to win a seat in Parliament. However, his good fortunes ebb again: his stepson, Lord Bullingdon, goes off to the American war, and Barry is accused of trying to get the lad killed in battle. Then his own child—Bryan—dies in a tragic horse-riding accident; this, combined with Barry's profligate spending practices, leads to his ruin.

As the "memoir" ends, (Redmond) Barry Lyndon is separated from his wife and placed in the Fleet Prison; a small stipend allows him to live in moderate luxury, and his elderly mother lodges close by to tend to him. He spends the rest of his life in prison, until he dies of alcoholism-related illness.

Adaptations
Stanley Kubrick adapted the novel into the film Barry Lyndon, released in 1975. Unlike in the novel, the film is not narrated by the titular character.

Irish playwright Don McCamphill produced a similar two-hour radio dramatization for the BBC in 2003. McCamphill's follows the book more closely than Kubrick's, but is more condensed.

References

External links
 
  Plain text.
 
The Memoirs of Barry Lyndon, Esq., Harper. 1898. Scanned book, illustrated. From Google Books.

1844 British novels
Novels by William Makepeace Thackeray
Picaresque novels
British novels adapted into films
Fiction with unreliable narrators
English-language novels
Novels first published in serial form
Works originally published in Fraser's Magazine
Novels adapted into radio programs